= Ell Lake =

Lake in the state of Wisconsin, United States

- Location within Wisconsin Location within the United States
- Location: Portage County, Wisconsin
- Coordinates: 44°28′08″N 89°21′36″W
- Type: lake
- Basin countries: United States
- Surface elevation: 1,093 ft (333 m)

Ell Lake is a lake in the U.S. state of Wisconsin.

Ell Lake most likely owes its name to the resemblance it shares with the letter L.
